Paul Constantin (born May 16, 1968) is a Canadian former professional ice hockey player who was the Most Outstanding Player for the 1992 NCAA Tournament.

Career
Constantin joined the program at Lake Superior State immediately after their first National Championship. He was a depth forward for three seasons but did help the Lakers return to the national tournament each year. As a senior, Constantin's offensive output dramatically improved and more than doubled his career totals. Constantin led the team in scoring during the season and got LSSU to finish second in the CCHA. The team won the conference title for the second consecutive year. The Lakers received the 3rd western seed and the offense dominated in their first two contests, winning 7–3 and 8–3 to make the program's second Frozen Four. In the semifinal, Constantin scored twice in the first and propelled the Lakers into the championship game. After the team went down 0–2 to Wisconsin early, Constantin got the Lakers on the board and began a 3-goal run that would eventually lead to a 5–3 win and a second championship for the Lakers. Constantin was named tournament MOP for his timely scoring.

After graduating, Constantin began his professional career in the Colonial Hockey League but ended up playing for four different teams during the year. He headed to Europe and played the next three seasons bouncing between teams in the United Kingdom. He found much more success in the British leagues, averaging more than two points per game at each of his stops. Once the 1998 season was over, he returned to North America and played parts of three years in low-level minor leagues before retiring in 2000. He later played a few seasons of senior hockey before hanging up his skates for good.

Career statistics

Regular season and playoffs

Awards and honors

References

External links 

1968 births
Living people
Canadian ice hockey left wingers
Ice hockey people from Ontario
Sportspeople from Burlington, Ontario
Lake Superior State Lakers men's ice hockey players
Flint Bulldogs players
Muskegon Fury players
Jacksonville Bullets players
Bracknell Bees players
Chelmsford Chieftains players
Peterborough Pirates players
Winston-Salem IceHawks players
New Mexico Scorpions players
Mohawk Valley Prowlers players
Amarillo Rattlers players
Vancouver Canucks draft picks
NCAA men's ice hockey national champions
AHCA Division I men's ice hockey All-Americans